Yuehai is the main branch of Yue Chinese, spoken in the Pearl River Delta of the province of Guangdong, as well as Hong Kong and Macau. It is commonly called Cantonese, though that name is more precisely applied to the Guangzhou topolect of Yuehai.

Topolects

Yuehai is divided into four principal dialects, each of which contains various subdialects. Cantonese is the prestige form.

Guangfu dialects
Guangzhou dialect
Hong Kong dialect
Macau dialect
Xiguan dialect
Wuzhou dialect
Tanka dialect
Sanyi / Nanpanshun dialects
Nanhai dialect
Jiujiang dialect
Xiqiao dialect
Shunde dialect
Xiangshan dialect
Shiqi dialect
Sanjiao dialect
Guanbao dialect
Dongguan dialect
Bao'an dialect (Waitau)

References

Cantonese language